The Anglican Schools Corporation (TASC) is an independent, co-educational, school system established by the Anglican Church Diocese of Sydney headquartered in Hurstville, New South Wales, Australia.

The number of schools in The Anglican Schools Corporation group has increased from five in 1995 to twenty in 2016.  The initial objective was to establish one new school per year.
The school system now contains seventeen schools and is non-selective, and currently caters for approximately 15,000 students from kindergarten to year 12, with plans to grow.

Relationship between the Corporation and member schools
The Corporation has a board to manage the overall budget and policies for members, including the establishment, financial maintenance and disestablishment of schools. The board is also responsible for the appointment and dismissal of school principals. The right of veto for principals’ appointment is held by local school councils. The chair of each local school council is appointed by the board. As an incorporated body, TASC can borrow funds for member schools, thus providing them with a working capital fund. There is a federated arrangement that all fees and grants that are raised by the school go to TASC and these are used to offset interest on loans. Schools cannot undertake major capital works that cost in excess of $30,000 without board approval. Each school has responsibility for the preparation and delivery of its budget and this is generally the responsibility of its school council. The principal reports to the school council but does not have voting rights. The school council monitors the management of the budget and is accountable to TASC board for the monthly budget report. The school council does not, however, have any involvement in the educational management of the school

Financial information
The Corporation received $88 million in government revenue in 2009, and parents paid $85 million and the Corporation posted a $20.7 million surplus in that year.

TASC along with all diocesan organisations is required to table audited accounts and annual reports at Synod and are reviewed by the Finance Committee.
Various questions have been raised at Synod about the Corporation including questions about why the Corporation does not make its accounts publicly available.

History

Establishment of the Corporation
TASC commenced operations in 1992 by assuming ownership and control of five existing schools – Roseville College, Danebank, Claremont, St Luke's Grammar, and Peninsular Boys Grammar (now closed).

Establishment of low fee schools in Sydney’s growth areas
In 1995 Archbishop Goodhew encouraged a policy to establish Low Fee Anglican Schools in the developing areas of the Diocese, particularly Western Sydney.

Anglican schools had made a major contribution to education in the past, but they were concentrated in the eastern and northern areas of Sydney and generally were not accessible to Anglicans on moderate incomes. He believed that the Church should address this imbalance, and that Low Fee Anglican Schools could provide an important link with the community to enhance gospel outreach and church growth in these new areas.

The Anglican Schools Corporation was advancing this strategy but found it hard to compete with the systemic Catholic schools which could start new schools and also attract the highest category of funding.  Without attracting the highest level of government funding, TASC was forced to have fees at least $500 p.a. higher.

By the end of 1995, TASC had done a lot of work to identify viable sites for new schools and had negotiated to secure land for at least three. It had even sought and gained government approval to start the schools and was ready to begin the first in 1997, but was reluctant to do so without access to the same level of high government funding as the Catholic systemic schools were able to attract.

Focussing resources for the Gospel
In 2001 the Synod adopted a ‘strategy driven’ model for the distribution of income where there were competing applications for funds by diocesan organisations.  In order to guide the Synod the Standing Committee recommended the adoption of the Archbishop's statement of the diocesan mission and the priority it gives to evangelism.

Diocesan Mission
In 2002 the Synod adopted the Diocesan Mission, the Initial Goal and the Four-Fold Mission Policies which were as follows:
Initial Goal – "To see at least 10% of the population of the Diocese in Bible-based Christian Churches in 10 years." Four-Fold Mission Policies:
Policy 1: Spiritual renewal
Policy 2: Increased number of congregations
Policy 3: Training of ministers
Policy 4: Structural change
The Archbishop then met with the head of the Sydney Anglican Schools Corporation to discuss the Diocesan Mission and the Four-Fold Mission Policies to consider the implications of each policy.

Establishment of a Mission Taskforce to review TASC

In early 2004 the ‘New Capital Project’ was set up to achieve the Diocesan Mission – specifically to raise the large amounts of money required by selling assets or generate cashflows from existing assets 
The rationale behind the New Capital Project (the "Project") was to test the proposition that large amounts of money could be generated from existing Church assets for these needs. In July 2004, the Standing Committee passed the New Capital Project Appropriation Ordinance 2004 to provide funding for the costs of undertaking stage 1 of the Project. Stage 1 of the Project had 2 aims - (a) to develop a data base of existing Diocesan assets and other information about our parishes and organisations, and (b) to analyse those assets, or a selection thereof, to determine if strategies can be developed to generate funds to meet other capital needs in the Diocese.
TASC, being a Diocesan organisation controlled by the Synod, was included in this project (Paragraph 19, Non-Schools Corporation schools were not included in this project.
The intention was to quickly build the required capital to achieve the Mission.
Some of the parishes that were targeted by the NCP expressed concerns.  There were acknowledged sensitivities about the project, and the willingness of each parish to agree to selling assets was an issue.

Connection with Mission Property Committee
The MPC considers projects in the Diocese which are experiencing or are likely to experience a rapid increase in population and projects which are likely to lead to a rapid increase in the number of persons attending churches in the Diocese.

List of current schools

See also

 List of non-government schools in New South Wales
 List of Anglican schools in Australia

References

External links
 The Anglican Schools Corporation website
 ACARA website
 ASIC website
 2008 Report to Synod
 2009 Report to Synod

1992 establishments in Australia
Schools
 *
Junior School Heads Association of Australia Member Schools